The carpet chameleon (Furcifer lateralis), also known as the white-lined chameleon, is a species of chameleon that is endemic to Madagascar. It was described in 1831 by John Edward Gray.

Description of habitat
Furcifer lateralis can be mainly found in central Madagascar. According to the International Union for Conservation of Nature (IUCN), the species is found around the entirety of Madagascar except the northern part. The population of Furcifer lateralis is currently stable.

Description
The males are largely green and females are heavier-bodied and have a wider range of colours, including bands of white, yellow and orange. Both sexes have stripy throats and lips. They can change their colour depending on their mood and environmental factors and they usually start the day with a dark colour to enable them to warm up rapidly by exposing themselves to sunlight. This species is one of the smallest "true" species of chameleon, and they are timid and shy. The form major has now been recognized as a separate species Furcifer major.

Reproduction
Furcifer lateralis adults mature at the age of three months. Females lay between eight and twenty-three eggs at one time,  and can produce up to three clutches a year.

Taxonomy
Furcifer lateralis is also commonly known as the jewel chameleon, the white-lined chameleon, and the carpet chameleon.

References

Furcifer
chameleon
chameleon
Reptiles described in 1831
Taxa named by John Edward Gray